Manushyabandhangal is a 1972 Indian Malayalam film, directed by Crossbelt Mani. The film stars Prem Nazir, Madhu, Sheela and Jayabharathi in the lead roles. The film had musical score by V. Dakshinamoorthy.

Cast

Prem Nazir as Sekharan
Madhu as Madhavan
Sheela as Sudha
Jayabharathi as Nirmala
Adoor Bhasi as Kumaran
N. N. Pillai
P. J. Antony as Sanku Pilla
C. A. Balan as Velu
Girish Kumar as Rajan
J. A. R. Anand as Police
Lakshmi Amma as Naniyamma
Nambiar
Paravoor Bharathan as Varghese
Ramankutty as George
S. P. Pillai as Nanu Nair
Sujatha as Mini

Soundtrack
The music was composed by V. Dakshinamoorthy and the lyrics were written by P. Bhaskaran.

References

External links
 

1972 films
1970s Malayalam-language films
Films directed by Crossbelt Mani